Dilmun, or Telmun, (Sumerian: , later 𒉌𒌇(𒆠), ni.tukki = DILMUNki) was an ancient East Semitic-speaking civilization in Eastern Arabia mentioned from the 3rd millennium BC onwards. 
Based on contextual evidence, it was located in the Persian Gulf, on a trade route between Mesopotamia and the Indus Valley civilisation, close to the sea and to artesian springs. Dilmun encompassed Bahrain, Kuwait, and eastern Saudi Arabia. This area is certainly what is meant by references to "Dilmun" among the lands conquered by King Sargon II and his descendants.

The great commercial and trading connections between Mesopotamia and Dilmun were strong and profound to the point where Dilmun was a central figure to the Sumerian creation myth. Dilmun was described in the saga of Enki and Ninhursag as pre-existing in paradisiacal state, where predators do not kill, pain and diseases are absent, and people do not get old.

Dilmun was an important trading centre. At the height of its power, it controlled the Persian Gulf trading routes. According to some modern theories, the Sumerians regarded Dilmun as a sacred place, but that is never stated in any known ancient text. Dilmun was mentioned by the Mesopotamians as a trade partner, a source of copper, and a trade entrepôt.

The Sumerian tale of the garden paradise of Dilmun may have been an inspiration for the Garden of Eden story.

History

Dilmun was an important trading center from the late fourth millennium to 800 BC. At the height of its power, Dilmun controlled the Persian Gulf trading routes. Dilmun was very prosperous during the first 300 years of the second millennium BC. Dilmun was conquered by the Middle Assyrian Empire (1365–1050 BC), and its 
commercial power began to decline between 1000 BC and 800 BC because piracy flourished in the Persian Gulf. In the 8th and 7th centuries BC the Neo-Assyrian Empire (911–605 BC)  conquered Dilmun, and in the 6th century BC the Neo-Babylonian Empire, and later the Achaemenid Empire, ruled Dilmun.

The Dilmun civilization was the centre of commercial activities linking traditional agriculture of the land—then utterly fertile due to artesian wells that have dried since, and due to a much wetter climate—with maritime trade between diverse regions such as the Indus Valley and Mesopotamia in its early stage and later between China and the Mediterranean. The Dilmun civilization is mentioned first in Sumerian cuneiform clay tablets dated to the late third millennium BC, found in the temple of goddess Inanna, in the city of Uruk. The adjective Dilmun is used to describe a type of axe and one specific official; in addition there are lists of rations of wool issued to people connected with Dilmun.

One of the earliest inscriptions mentioning Dilmun is that of king Ur-Nanshe of Lagash (c. 2300 BC) found in a door-socket: "The ships of Dilmun brought him wood as tribute from foreign lands."

Kingdom of Dilmun 

From about 2050 BC onward Dilmun seems to had its heyday. Qal'at al-Bahrain was most likely the capital of Dilmun. From texts found at Isin it becomes clear that Dilmun became an independent kingdom free from Mesopotamian rule. Royal gifts to Dilmun are mentioned. Contacts with the Amorite state of Mari in the northern Levant are attested. In about this time the largest royal burial mounds were erected. From about 1780 BC come several inscriptions on stone vessels naming two kings of Dilmun. King Yagli-El and his father Rimum. The inscriptions were found in huge tumuli evidently the burial places of these kings. Rimum was already known to archaeology from the Durand Stone, discovered in 1879.

From about 1720 BC a decline is visible. Many settlements were no longer used and the building of royal mounts stopped. The Barbar Temple fell into ruins. From about 1650 BC there is recovering period detectable. New royal burial mounts were built and at Qal'at al-Bahrain there is evidence for increased building activity. To this period belongs a further inscription on a seal found at Failaka and preserving a king's name. The short text readsː [La]'ù-la Panipa, daughter of Sumu-lěl, the servant of Inzak of Akarum. Sumu-lěl was evidently a third king of Dilmun belonging to about this period. Servant of Inzak of Akarum was the king's title in Dilmun. The names of these later rulers are Amoritic.

Dilmun under foreign rule 

It seems that Dilmun was after 1500 BC under the rule of the Akkadian speaking Mesopotamian Sealand Dynasty. The Sealand-Dynasty king Ea-gamil is mentioned in a text found at  Qal'at al-Bahrain. Ea-gamil was the last ruler of the Sealand Dynasty. After his reign Dilmun came under the rule of the Babylonian Kassite dynasty, as they also took over the Sealand Dynasty area.
Dilmun was mentioned in two letters dated to the reign of Burna-Buriash II (c. 1370 BC) recovered from Nippur, during the Kassite dynasty of Babylon. These letters were from a provincial official, Ilī-ippašra, in Dilmun to his friend Enlil-kidinni, the governor of Nippur. The names referred to are Akkadian. These letters and other documents, hint at an administrative relationship between Dilmun and Babylon at that time. Following the collapse of the Kassite dynasty in 1595 BC, Mesopotamian documents make no mention of Dilmun until  Assyrian inscriptions dated from 1250 BC to 1050 BC which proclaimed Assyrian kings to be rulers of Dilmun and Meluhha, as well as Lower Sea and Upper Sea. Assyrian inscriptions recorded tribute from Dilmun.

There are other Assyrian inscriptions during the first millennium BC indicating Assyrian sovereignty over Dilmun. One of the early sites discovered in Bahrain suggests that Sennacherib, king of Assyria (707–681 BC), attacked northeast Arabia and captured the Bahraini islands.  The most recent reference to Dilmun came during the Neo-Babylonian Empire. Neo-Babylonian administrative records, dated 567 BC, stated that Dilmun was controlled by the king of Babylon. The name of Dilmun fell from use after the collapse of Babylon in 538 BC, with the area henceforth identified as Tylos during the Hellenistic period.

The "Persian Gulf" types of circular, stamped (rather than rolled) seals known from Dilmun, that appear at Lothal in Gujarat, India, and Failaka, as well as in Mesopotamia, are convincing corroboration of the long-distance sea trade. What the commerce consisted of is less known: timber and precious woods, ivory, lapis lazuli, gold, and luxury goods such as carnelian and glazed stone beads, pearls from the Persian Gulf, shell and bone inlays, were among the goods sent to Mesopotamia in exchange for silver, tin, woolen textiles, olive oil and grains.

Copper ingots from Oman and bitumen which occurred naturally in Mesopotamia may have been exchanged for cotton textiles and domestic fowl, major products of the Indus region that are not native to Mesopotamia. Instances of all of these trade goods have been found. The importance of this trade is shown by the fact that the weights and measures used at Dilmun were in fact identical to those used by the Indus, and were not those used in Southern Mesopotamia.

In regard to copper mining and smelting, the Umm al-Nar culture and Dalma in the United Arab Emirates, and Ibri in Oman were particularly important.

Some Meluhhan vessels may have sailed directly to Mesopotamian ports, but by the Isin-Larsa Period, Dilmun monopolized the trade. The Bahrain National Museum assesses that its "Golden Age" lasted ca. 2200–1600 BC. Discoveries of ruins under the Persian Gulf may be of Dilmun.

People, language and religion
The population used cuneiform to write in the Akkadian language, and, like the Akkadians, Assyrians, Babylonians and Eblaites of Mesopotamia, spoke an East Semitic language that was either an Akkadian dialect or one close to it,  rather than a Central Semitic language, and its known rulers had East Semitic names. Dilmun's main deity was named Inzak and his spouse was Panipa. However there are no indication of population replacement happening in the region.

Mythology

In the early epic Enmerkar and the Lord of Aratta, the main events, which center on Enmerkar's construction of the ziggurats in Uruk and Eridu, are described as taking place at a time "before Dilmun had yet been settled".

Dilmun, sometimes described as "the place where the sun rises" and "the Land of the Living", is the scene of some versions of the Sumerian creation myth, and the place where the deified Sumerian hero of the flood, Utnapishtim (Ziusudra), was taken by the gods to live forever. Thorkild Jacobsen's translation of the Eridu Genesis calls it "Mount Dilmun" which he locates as a "faraway, half-mythical place".

Dilmun is also described in the epic story of Enki and Ninhursag as the site at which the Creation occurred. The later Babylonian Enuma Elish, speaks of the creation site as the place where the mixture of salt water, personified as Tiamat met and mingled with the fresh water of Abzu.  Bahrain in Arabic means "the twin waters", where the fresh water of the Arabian aquifer mingles with the salt waters of the Persian Gulf. The promise of Enki to Ninhursag, the Earth Mother:
For Dilmun, the land of my lady's heart, I will create long waterways, rivers and canals, whereby water will flow to quench the thirst of all beings and bring abundance to all that lives.
Ninlil, the Sumerian goddess of air and south wind had her home in Dilmun.

However, it is also speculated that Gilgamesh had to pass through Mount Mashu to reach Dilmun in the Epic of Gilgamesh, which is usually identified with the whole of the parallel Lebanon and Anti-Lebanon ranges, with the narrow gap between these mountains constituting the tunnel.

Location of Dilmun

In 1987, Theresa Howard-Carter proposed that Dilmun of this era might be a still unidentified tell near the Arvand Rud (Shatt al-Arab in Arabic) between modern-day Quanah and Basra in modern-day Iraq. In favor of Howard-Carter's proposal, it has been noted that this area does lie to the east of Sumer ("where the sun rises"), and the riverbank where Dilmun's maidens would have been accosted aligns with the Shat al-Arab which is in the midst of marshes. The "mouth of the rivers" where Dilmun was said to lie is for her the union of the Tigris and Euphrates at Qurnah. A number of scholars have suggested that Dilmun originally designated the eastern province of modern  Saudi Arabia, notably linked with the major Dilmunite settlements of Umm an-Nussi and Umm ar-Ramadh in the interior and Tarout on the coast.

As of 2022, archaeologists have failed to find a site in existence during the time from 3300 BC (Uruk IV) to 556 BC (Neo-Babylonian Era), when Dilmun appears in texts. According to Hojlund, no settlements exist in the Gulf littoral dating to 3300–2000 BC.

Garden of Eden theory
In 1922, Eduard Glaser proposed that the Garden of Eden was located in Eastern Arabia within the Dilmun civilization. Scholar Juris Zarins also believes that the Garden of Eden was situated in Dilmun at the head of the Persian Gulf (present-day Kuwait), where the Tigris and Euphrates Rivers run into the sea, from his research on this area using information from many different sources, including Landsat images from space. In this theory, the Bible's Gihon would correspond with the Karun in Iran, and the Pishon River would correspond to the Wadi al-Batin river system that once drained the now dry, but once quite fertile central part of the Arabian Peninsula.

Known rulers
Only a few rulers of the Dilmun kingdom are known:
 Ziusudra (27th century BC)
 Rimun (c. 1780 BC)
 Yagli-El, son of Rimun 
 Sumu-lěl (c. 1650 BC)
 Usiananuri, grandfather of Uballissu-Marduk (precise dates unknown)
 Ilī-ippašra (contemporary with Burnaburiash II and Kurigalzu II)
 Operi (c. 710 BC)
 Hundaru I (c. 650 BC)
 Qena (c. 680–c. 670 BC)
 Hundaru II (706–685 BC)

See also
 Bahrain National Museum
 DHL International Aviation ME, a cargo airline using "Dilmun" as radio call sign
 Dilmun Burial Mounds
 Gerrha
 Gilgamesh
 History of Bahrain
 History of Kuwait
 Indus–Mesopotamia relations
 Kuwait National Museum
 Uruk

References

External links
Indus Valley—Mesopotamian trade passing through Dilmun
Lost ancient civilisation's ruins lie beneath Gulf, says boffin
Bahrain National Museum's hall of Dilmun
Dilmun Site Al-Khidr, Failaka Island, State of Kuwait
Greek inscriptions found on Bahrein (a pdf-file)
Dilmun Calendar Theory Backed, Gulf Daily News, 11 July 2006

Sumer
Bronze Age countries in Asia
Ancient Mesopotamia
History of Eastern Arabia
Archaeological sites in Bahrain
Archaeological sites in Kuwait
Tiamat